Alfred Kerr (né Kempner; 25 December 1867 – 12 October 1948,) was an influential German theatre critic and essayist of Jewish descent, nicknamed the Kulturpapst ("Culture Pope").

Biography

Youth

Kerr was born in Breslau, Silesia, the son of Helene (Calé) and Meyer Emanuel Kempner, who was a wine trader. He had one sister always known as Annchen: she married Siegfried Ollendorf and ultimately left Germany for Palestine. His family was Jewish. Alfred said while still at school that he intended to shorten his name to Kerr, which became official in 1909. He studied literature in Berlin with Erich Schmidt and completed his Ph.D. at the University of Halle. Alfred Kerr worked as a theatre critic for Der Tag and later for the Berliner Tageblatt. He wrote weekly Berliner Briefe for the Breslauer Zeitung from 1895–1900 and for the Königsberger Allgemeine Zeitung from 1897 to 1922. With the publisher Paul Cassirer he founded the artistic review Pan in 1910.

Career

Kerr changed his surname to avoid association with Friederike Kempner. Kerr was noted for his treatment of drama criticism as another branch of literary criticism. As his fame grew he engaged in polemics, with the critics Maximilian Harden, Herbert Ihering and Karl Kraus in particular. In the 1920s he was hostile to Bertolt Brecht, and assailed him with accusations of plagiarism.

Exile

In 1933 Kerr was warned by a policeman that his passport was about to be confiscated. He fled to Prague immediately. His wife Julia and their children followed him to Switzerland later. They then went to Paris and then, after the purchase of a film script by Alexander Korda, to England. (These years of exile are described, from a child's perspective, by Kerr's daughter, author Judith Kerr, in her Out of the Hitler Time trilogy.) His books were amongst those burnt in May 1933 by the Nazis when they came to power; Kerr had attacked the Nazi Party publicly very early on and Goebbels said before Hitler came to power that Kerr would be one of the first he would shoot. He lived in penury in London. He was a founder of the Freier Deutscher Kulturbund, and worked for the German PEN club. An old feud with Karl Kraus worked against him at the BBC.

Kerr became naturalised as a British subject in 1947. In 1948 he visited Hamburg at the start of a planned tour of several German cities but suffered a stroke, and then decided to end his own life via an overdose of Veronal, procured for him by his wife. He was buried, without references to religion according to his wishes, in Ohlsdorf Cemetery in the position "Z 21-217"  and his wife was cremated with her ashes buried at the foot of his grave when she died in 1965.

The Alfred-Kerr-Preis für Literaturkritik was established in 1977. His Berliner Briefe for the Breslauer Zeitung were published as Wo liegt Berlin in 1997, Warum fliesst der Rhein nicht durch Berlin and as Was ist der Mensch in Berlin in 2017. Wo liegt Berlin was a best-seller and the proceeds were given by Michael and Judith Kerr to the Kerr Foundation in Berlin which awards an annual Kerr Prize for a young actor. An eight volume edition of his works has been published and a biography of 720 pages appeared in 2016.

Family

Alfred Kerr married for the first time when he was over 50, to Ingeborg Thormählen, who was much younger than he, and who shortly afterwards died in the 1918 flu pandemic while pregnant; the bereavement affected him deeply.   His second marriage was to the talented musician, Julia Weismann (1898–1965) in 1920. Julia was the daughter of a Prussian Secretary of State, .   The Kerrs' son Michael Kerr became a prominent British lawyer. Their daughter Judith Kerr wrote a three-volume autobiography and the children's books The Tiger Who Came To Tea and the Mog series; the writer Matthew Kneale is her son with Nigel Kneale, the author of Quatermass scripts.

Works

Godwi. Ein Kapitel deutscher Romantik (1898). Dissertation on Clemens Brentano. 
Das neue Drama (1905) 
Die Harfe (1917) poems 
Ich sage, was zu sagen ist: Theaterkritiken 1893–1919. Werke Band VII, 1.
New York und London, travel 
O Spanien!, travel 
Caprichos (1926) poems 
Buch der Freundschaft (1928) children's literature	
So liegt der Fall Theaterkritiken 1919 – 1933 und im Exil
Der Dichter und die Meerschweinchen: Clemens Tecks letztes Experiment
Diktatur des Hausknechts
Walther Rathenau. Erinnerungen eines Freundes 
Gruss an Tiere (1955) with Gerhard F. Hering 
Theaterkritiken (1971) selected criticism
Ich kam nach England (1979) diary
Mit Schleuder und Harfe (1982)
Wo liegt Berlin? Briefe aus der Reichshauptstadt (1997) 
Warum fließt der Rhein nicht durch Berlin? Briefe eines europäischen Flaneurs. 1895 bis 1900 (1999)
Alfred Kerr, Lesebuch zu Leben und Werk (1999)
Mein Berlin (2002)
Sucher und Selige. Literarische Ermittungen Werke Band IV, (2009)
Das war meine Zeit Band V/VI (2013)
Was ist der Mensch in Berlin Aufbau-Verlag (2017)
Berlin wird Berlin Vier Bände Wallstein-Verlag (2021)

Further reading 
 
 
 
 
 Deborah Vietor-Engländer, Alfred Kerr Die Biographie Rowohlt Verlag 2016

References

External links
 

1867 births
1948 deaths
19th-century German writers
19th-century German male writers
20th-century German non-fiction writers
Jewish atheists
German theatre critics
Silesian Jews
Jewish emigrants from Nazi Germany to the United Kingdom
People from the Province of Silesia
Writers from Wrocław
Naturalised citizens of the United Kingdom
Burials at the Ohlsdorf Cemetery
20th-century German male writers
German male non-fiction writers
Alfred
Jewish German writers